Liam Currams (born 26 January 1961) is an Irish former hurler and Gaelic footballer who played as a midfielder and left wing-back for both Offaly senior teams. His inter-county career lasted from 1980 until 1986.

Currams holds a unique place in the annals of Gaelic games in Offaly as a successful dual player at the highest levels. He has won one All-Ireland medal and two Leinster medals in hurling, while has also won one All-Ireland medal and three Leinster medals in football.

Currams has a number of personal achievements.

He is one of only four players to have won All Stars Awards in both hurling and football.

He is the only Offaly player to do so.

At club level Currams played with Kilcormac–Killoughey.

He lives in County Donegal.

References

1961 births
Living people
Dual players
Kilcormac-Killoughey hurlers
Kilcormac-Killoughey Gaelic footballers
Offaly inter-county hurlers
Offaly inter-county Gaelic footballers
All-Ireland Senior Hurling Championship winners
Winners of one All-Ireland medal (Gaelic football)